The city of Chester contains over 500 Grade II listed buildings.  They have been split into four geographical areas:

 Grade II listed buildings in Chester (central)
 Grade II listed buildings in Chester (east)
 Grade II listed buildings in Chester (north and west)
 Grade II listed buildings in Chester (south)

See also

 Grade I listed buildings in Cheshire
 Grade II* listed buildings in Cheshire

 
Chester